Mr. Charlie is a 1993 Pakistani Urdu romantic comedy film directed by Umer Shareef. The lead cast included Shakila Qureshi, Umer Shareef, Deeba and Afzaal Ahmad.

Cast
 Shakila Qureshi
 Umer Shareef
 Sherien
 Shafqat
 Deeba
 Afzaal Ahmad

Release and box office
Mr. Charlie was released on 25 March 1993.

Music and soundtracks
The playback music was composed by  Kemal Ahmed and lyrics were penned by Umer Shareef:
 Ladka Badnaam Hua Haseena Teray liye — Singer: Umer Sharif

Awards

References

1993 films
Pakistani musical films
1990s Urdu-language films
Nigar Award winners
1993 romantic drama films
Pakistani comedy films
Urdu-language Pakistani films